Sir Richard Baggallay PC (1816 – 1888) was a British barrister, politician, and judge. After serving as Attorney-General under Benjamin Disraeli from 1874 to 1875, Baggallay was appointed a Lord Justice of Appeal in Chancery (Lord Justice of Appeal from 1877), serving until his death in 1883.

Background and education
Baggallay was one of the sons of Richard Baggallay, of Stockwell, a member of the Merchant Taylors' Company and a significant warehouseman of the City of London (d.1870, will sworn at under £30,000). He attended Gonville and Caius College, Cambridge where he graduated with a BA in 1839 followed by an MA in 1842. He was called to the Bar, Lincoln's Inn, in 1843.

Political and legal career
Bagallay sat as a Conservative Party Member of Parliament (MP) for Hereford from 1865 to 1868. He was knighted on 14 December 1868 after losing his seat, but was re-elected in 1870 as MP for Mid Surrey, holding the seat until 1875. He served briefly as Solicitor-General under Benjamin Disraeli in 1868 and again in 1874, and as Attorney-General under Disraeli from 1874 to 1875. In 1875, he was sworn of the Privy Council and appointed to the newly established Court of Appeal, where he served until his death in 1888.

Judgments
Parker v South Eastern Railway [1877] 2 CPD 416 - English contract law on exclusion clauses holding that an individual cannot escape a contractual term by failing to read the contract, but that a party wanting to rely on an exclusion clause must take reasonable steps to bring it to the attention of the customer.
The Household Fire and Carriage Accident Insurance Company (Limited) v Grant (1878–79) 4 Ex D 216 - Contract law concerning the "postal rule", and containing an important dissent by Bramwell LJ, who wished to dispose of it.
Tamplin v James (1880) 15 Ch D 215 (CA), upholding a decision of Baggallay in the first instance; contract law concerning the availability of specific performance for a breach of contract induced by mistake.
Re Hallett's Estate (1880) 13 Ch D 696 - English trusts law concerning asset tracing, Baggallay LJ concurring with Fry LJ.
Redgrave v Hurd (1881) 20 Ch D 1 - Contract law - misrepresentation, holding that a contract can be rescinded for innocent misrepresentation, even where the represent(ee) had the chance to verify the false statement; Baggallay concurring with Jessel MR.
Hutton v West Cork Rly Co (1883) 23 Ch D 654 - UK company law case concerning the limits of a director's discretion to spend company funds for the (clear) benefit of non-shareholders without a shareholder vote; Baggallay dissenting from the decision of Cotton LJ and Bowen LJ.
Smith v Land and House Property Corp (1884) 28 Ch D 7 - Contract law case - misrepresentation, holding that a statement of opinion can represent that one knows certain facts, and can amount to misrepresentation; Baggallay LJ concurring with Bowen LJ

Personal life
He married, on 25 February 1847, Marianne, youngest daughter of Henry Charles Lacy of Withdean Hall, Sussex, by whom he left children.

In later years Baggallay suffered from poor health and died while convalescing at 10 Brunswick Square, Hove, Sussex. He was buried at South Metropolitan Cemetery at Norwood.

Legacy
He left executors as his widow at 55 Queens Gate, South Kensington and three sons, who lived at their houses in Elm Park Road, Chelsea and Onslow Square.

References 

Attribution

Sources 
 Obituary, The Times, 14 November 1888

External links 
 

1816 births
1888 deaths
Burials at West Norwood Cemetery
Attorneys General for England and Wales
Solicitors General for England and Wales
Lords Justices of Appeal
Conservative Party (UK) MPs for English constituencies
UK MPs 1865–1868
UK MPs 1868–1874
UK MPs 1874–1880
Members of the Privy Council of the United Kingdom
Knights Bachelor
Members of the Judicial Committee of the Privy Council
Alumni of Gonville and Caius College, Cambridge
People from Lambeth
Lawyers from London